New Trier may refer to:
New Trier Township, Illinois, USA
New Trier High School
New Trier, Minnesota, USA